Catoptria mediofasciella is a moth in the family Crambidae. It was described by Zerny in 1914. It is found in Armenia.

References

Crambini
Moths described in 1914
Moths of Asia